The 2005–06 Libyan Premier League was the 38th edition of the Libyan Premier League, the top flight of Libyan football organised by the Libyan Football Federation.

Competition
There were 18 clubs in the league for this season, split into two groups of nine. The nine teams in each group played each other home and away, resulting in 16 games being played in each group. The top three teams from each group progressed to the next stage, the 'Championship Play-Off'. The champions, Al Ittihad, won their twelfth league title, and gained qualification to the CAF Champions League for the next season.

Teams

Group A

Group B

Group tables

Group A

Group B

Championship stage
In this stage, the six clubs (3 from each group) that qualified played each other home & away. The team with the most points after the 10 games would be crowned champions. The two teams that finished first in their group, Al Olympic and Al Ahly Tripoli, received three bonus points to take through to this stage, while the two teams that finished second, Al Akhdar and Al Ittihad, received one bonus point.

Final table

Relegation play-off
The 10 teams that finished 4th-8th in their respective groups: Rafik Sorman, Al Charara, Al Hilal, Al Madina, Al Mustaqbal, Al Urouba, Al Majd, Al Shat, Al Wahda and Al Swihli, along with the two teams that finished second in their respective groups in the Second Division this season, Al Harati and Al Soukour, altogether 12 teams, were split into two groups of 6 teams. The 6 teams in each group would play each other home & away, and the top three teams would play in the Libyan Premier League the next season. Premier League teams that finished fourth in their respective groups (Rafik Sorman and Al Urouba) received three bonus points, while teams that finished fifth in their respective groups (Al Majd and Al Charara) received one bonus point each.

Group tables

Group A

Group B

Top goalscorers

18 goals
 Samir Al Wahaj (Al Wahda)
15 goals
  Omar Diop (Al Madina)
12 goals
  Osama Fazzani (Al Ahly Tripoli)
  Ahmed Saad (Al Ahly T.)
  Nader Kara (Al Ahly Tripoli)

Libyan Premier League seasons
1
Liby